EqualLogic, Inc. was an American computer data storage company based in Nashua, New Hampshire, active from 2001 to 2007. In 2008, the company was merged into Dell Inc. Dell-branded EqualLogic products are iSCSI-based storage area network (SAN) systems. Dell has 3 different lines of SAN products: EqualLogic, Compellent and Dell PowerVault.

History 
EqualLogic was a company based in Nashua, New Hampshire. Formed in 2001 by Peter Hayden, Paul Koning, and Paula Long, it raised $52 million from investors between 2001 and 2004. The company was considering an initial public offering on the Nasdaq stock-exchange, but accepted an offer from Dell in 2007, and was absorbed in late January 2008. The all-cash take-over transaction of $1.4 billion was the highest price paid for a company financed by venture investors at the time. At the time of acquisition, the company was backed by four venture capital investors: Charles River Ventures, TD Capital Ventures, Focus Ventures and Sigma Partners.

Architecture 
EqualLogic systems use iSCSI via either Gigabit Ethernet or 10 Gigabit Ethernet controllers. The currently (June 2014) sold systems with 1 Gbit/s connections are the PS4100, PS6100 and PS6200 while the comparable systems with 10 Gbit/s Ethernet connections are PS4110, PS6110 and PS6210. There have been a number of previous generations, and as long as the software is updated on older systems they can work with the newer models.  Within each series there are several options allowing for different types and sizes of hard disk drives or solid-state drives. EqualLogic options combine both in the same chassis and automatically migrate the most frequently accessed data to the SSDs.  All PS series systems, except the PS-M4110 blade chassis system, are 19-inch rack systems in a 2 rack unit form factor or a 4 RU chassis for some of the PS61x0 models and the PS65x0 dense models.

EqualLogic Arrays can be combined with up to 16 arrays per group. Groups can mix different members, including multiple hardware generations, as well as different RAID types, in a group.  By combining multiple arrays per group, very large storage groups can be created with maximum capacity in one group of over 1.5 PB. Arrays can be segmented into pools, and from pools, volumes.  Volumes are exposed on a SAN network, and used by virtual machine hosts or other computers.

Controllers 

Each array comes with two controllers, offering redundancy and load-balancing. A controller offers one or more data Ethernet interfaces for the iSCSI traffic and one management interface. A typical array has 2 or more iSCSI Ethernet interfaces and one management interface.
The arrays with model PS XX00 have Gigabit Ethernet ports while the PS XX10 offer 10 Gigabit Ethernet ports for iSCSI traffic and a 10 Mbit/s / 100 Mbit/s management port.  Depending on the model the interfaces can be either copper-based Gigabit Ethernet or 10GBASE-T or fiber-optic interfaces using  small form-factor pluggable transceivers.
Controllers can be readily identified by a combination of their "faceplate" profile and color.

Models 

The flagship product of the EqualLogic line is the PS Series (formerly PeerStorage). Its current primary models are the PS4100, PS6100 and PS6500 with 1Gb Ethernet and 10 Gb Ethernet model options. Within each "series" (i.e. 4100, 6100 and 6500) there are several sub models that include specific disk configurations.  The last generation systems are the PS4100 and PS6100 series systems which continue to be sold.

PS41x0 
The PS4100 series consists of 4 rack-models and one PS-M4110 for placement in the Dell M1000e blade enclosure. This model is described separately below.

PS61x0 
The PS61x0 series consists of two main models: PS6100 and PS6110 for 1G or 10G iSCSI ethernet ports on the controller. All arrays support RAID levels 6,10 and 50.

For the PS6100 series and PS6110 series there are 6 sube-models, based on the type of disks used:

PS-M 4110 
The PS-M 4110 is a SAN array in the form-factor of a dual 1/2 height blade-server and can be installed in the Dell M1000e blade-chassis. There are 4 models of this "datacenter in a box" solution where servers, storage and networking are all combined in one blade-enclosure

The SAN communicates with the blade servers in the chassis and/or external servers via Force10 MXL switches, PowerConnect M8024-K or Brocade based PC-M8428-K in the back of the enclosure. Also possible to use 10G Passthrough modules and external switches.

PS6500 and PS6510 
The PS65x0 series consists of in total 6 models scalable SAN solutions. As with the other series the PS6500 is using 1Gb ethernet NIC's and the PS6510 offers 10Gb SFP+ interfaces.

FS7500 / FS7600 
Dell Fluid File System is available in combination with an EQLX array for the storage. FluidFS is also delivered in combination with Compellent and PowerVault SAN systems.
Both the FS7500 and FS7600 NAS using EQLX SAN offers a maximum system site of 509 TB. The FS7600 is the 2nd generation system which is also available using 10G iSCSI speeds between the FS controller and the storage backbone

References

Dell products
2001 establishments in New Hampshire
2008 disestablishments in New Hampshire
American companies established in 2001
American companies disestablished in 2008
Companies acquired by Dell
Computer companies established in 2001
Computer companies disestablished in 2008
Computer storage companies
Defunct computer companies of the United States
Defunct computer hardware companies